The Aquidabã River is a river of Paraná state in southern Brazil. It is a tributary of the Pinguim River, which flows into the Ivaí River.

See also
List of rivers of Paraná

References

Rivers of Paraná (state)